This page shows aggregate tables and attendance averages for the 2004/05 season of Royal League.

Results table by country

Results table by club

Average attendances by country

Average attendances by club 

Note: Göteborg had an extra home game in the final

See also 

 All-time Royal League statistics

statistics
Royal League statistics